The Central District of Sahneh County is a district (bakhsh) in Sahneh County, Kermanshah Province, Iran. At the 2006 census, its population was 55,854, in 14,064 families.  The District has one city: Sahneh. The District has four rural districts (dehestan): Gamasiyab Rural District, Hojr Rural District, Khodabandehlu Rural District, and Sahneh Rural District.

References 

Sahneh County
Districts of Kermanshah Province